The Best of UB40 – Volume One is a compilation album by the British reggae band UB40. It was released in 1987 and includes a selection of the band's hits from 1980 to 1986.

The pub on the cover of the album is the Eagle and Tun, frequented by UB40 as it is close to their DEP International recording studios in Digbeth, Birmingham. The Best of UB40 – Volume One was re-released in July 1995 along with the release of The Best of UB40 – Volume Two.

Track listing

Side 1
"Food for Thought" – 4:09 from Signing Off
"King" – 4:35 from Signing Off
"My Way of Thinking" - 4:31 from The Singles Album
"One in Ten" – 4:32 from Present Arms
"Red Red Wine" – 5:21 from Labour of Love
"Please Don't Make Me Cry" – 3:26 from Labour of Love
"Many Rivers to Cross – 4:31 from Labour of Love

Side 2
"Cherry Oh Baby" – 3:18 from Labour of Love
"If It Happens Again" – 3:44 from Geffery Morgan
"I Got You Babe" – 3:09 from Baggariddim
"Don't Break My Heart" – 3:49 from Baggariddim
"Sing Our Own Song" – 3:59 from Rat in the Kitchen
"Rat in Mi Kitchen" – 6:56 from Rat in the Kitchen
"Maybe Tomorrow" – 3:23 Previously unreleased

CD version
"Food for Thought" – 4:11 from Signing Off
"King" – 4:34 from Signing Off
"My Way of Thinking" – 3:24 from The Singles Album
"The Earth Dies Screaming" – 4:38 from The Singles Album
"Dream a Lie" – 3:38 from The Singles Album
"Don't Let It Pass You By" – 7:45 from Present Arms
"Don't Slow Down" – 4:28 from Present Arms
"One in Ten" – 4:32 from Present Arms
"Red Red Wine" – 3:03 from Labour of Love
"Please Don't Make Me Cry" – 3:26 from Labour of Love
"Many Rivers To Cross" – 4:31 from Labour of Love
"Cherry Oh Baby" – 3:18 from Labour of Love
"If It Happens Again" – 3:44 from Geffery Morgan
"I Got You Babe" – 3:09 from Baggariddim
"Don't Break My Heart" – 3:49 from Baggariddim
"Sing Our Own Song" – 4:08 from Rat in the Kitchen
"Rat in Mi Kitchen" – 3:08 from Rat in the Kitchen
"Maybe Tomorrow" – 3:23 Previously unreleased

Note
 "I Got You Babe" features Chrissie Hynde.

Charts

Weekly charts

Year-end charts

Certifications

Notes

1987 compilation albums
UB40 compilation albums
Virgin Records compilation albums